Wythenshawe Town Centre is a tram stop on the Manchester Metrolink Airport Line. It opened on 3 November 2014. It is in Wythenshawe town centre next to shops, the library and Wythenshawe Forum. A new Wythenshawe bus station was built next to the Metrolink station, which replaced existing stops at the former bus station and Wythenshawe Forum.

Services
Trams run every 12 minutes north to Manchester city centre and south to Manchester Airport.

Ticket zones 
Wythenshawe Town Centre stop is located in Metrolink ticket zone 4.

References

External links

 Metrolink stop information
 Wythenshawe Town Centre area map
 Light Rail Transit Association
 Airport route map

Tram stops in Manchester